Tump means a hillock, mound, barrow or tumulus. The Welsh words  and  may be related. Although some may appear similar to glacial drumlins, for the most part they are man-made, e.g. remains from mineral extraction, burial mounds (tumuli and especially bowl barrows) or motte-and-bailey castle mounds. The following geographical features in the UK are referred to using the word:

Almondsbury Tump: a slight prominence near the top of the scarp, in open space near the Swan, Almondsbury, South Gloucestershire
Barry's Hill Tump: a barrow in the civil parish of Leafield, Oxfordshire
Battle Tump: a castle motte, Scheduled Ancient Monument, Lower Common, Gilwern, Monmouthshire
Bettws Newydd tump: an early Norman motte-and-bailey tump in Monmouthshire
Bledisloe Tump: a castle in Awre, Gloucestershire
Brinklow Castle known locally as 'the Tump': a medieval castle in the village of Brinklow, Warwickshire
Caple Tump: an earthwork reputed to be the remains of a castle motte in King's Caple, Herefordshire
Castle Tump: an early 11th-century motte-and-bailey castle in Trecastle, Powys
Castle Tump, Caerwent: site of a Roman villa in Monmouthshire 
Castle Tump, Dymock: a castle in Dymock, Gloucestershire
Castle Tump Motte (see Glasbury Castle), Glasbury, Powys
Castle Tump, Tenbury Wells: believed to be the remains of an early Norman motte-and-bailey castle near Burford, Shropshire and Tenbury Wells, Worcestershire
Cole's Tump, an area of pillow mounds on the west side side of Orcop Hill, Herefordshire, that overlooks the village of the same name
Congrove Field and The Tumps: north of Bath (Bath and North East Somerset), possibly the site of mining activities in the past
Crugyn Tump: castle mound/motte, Beguildy, Powys
East Tump and West Tump: small (ca. 50m and 100m long respectively) tidal islands off the respective coasts of the Island of Grassholm
Edmunds Tump: a hill near Grosmont in north-eastern Monmouthshire
Hetty Pegler's Tump: a Neolithic burial mound near the village of Uley, Gloucestershire
Knucklas Castle Mound: site of a castle near the battlefield of the Battle of Beguildy, Powys
Leigh Castle Tump: earthwork and buried remains of a medieval motte-and-bailey castle at Castle Green near Leigh, Worcestershire
Loxidge Tump cairn: round cairn on the Offa's Dyke Path, Hatterrall Ridge, with Llanthony to one side and Llanveynoe the other; there are several other cairns nearby in general vicinity of Llanvihangel Crucorney
Keynsham Humpy Tumps: site of open patches of grassland and bare rock, interspersed with blocks of scrub, alongside the Bristol to Bath railway line
Maes Tump: an Iron Age hillfort in Somerset
Monkey Tump: 12th-century motte castle in Tonteg, Rhondda Cynon Taf
Nan Tow's Tump: a round barrow by the A46 near Oldbury-on-the-Hill, Gloucestershire
Newcourt Tump: earthwork remains of a small motte-and-bailey castle 1 milenorth of Bacton, Herefordshire
Newton Tump: remains of a motte-and-bailey castle 3 miles southeast of Clifford, Herefordshire
Robin Hood's Tump (see under 'Buildings and structures'): prehistoric burial ground near Alpraham, Cheshire
St Weonards Tump: immediately south of St Weonards churchyard, Herefordshire
Slwch Tump: an Iron Age hill fort close to Brecon, Powys
Stow Green Tump, also known as Castle Tump: remains of a castle near the village of St Briavels, Gloucestershire
Swanborough Tump: a hillock in the parish of Manningford Abbots, Wiltshire, identified as the moot-place mentioned in the will of King Alfred
Table Hill tump: in the Malvern Hills between North Hill and Sugarloaf Hill (Herefordshire–Worcestershire border)
Tappa's Tump or "Tæppa's mound": burial mound near Taplow, Buckinghamshire
"The Tump": ancient burial mound near Whittington, Worcestershire
Tump Farm, Wilcrick: a farm near Wilcrick Hill, which was a hillfort in former Monmouthshire
Tump Terret: mound marking the site of a small motte-and-bailey castle in Trellech, Monmouthshire
Twmpath Castle, a motte-and-bailey castle in Rhiwbina, Cardiff
Turkey Tump: on the ridge immediately north-west of Llanwarne, Herefordshire
Wednesbury Tump (see 'Post-Medieval times'): Wednesbury, West Midlands
Whittington Tump: central Worcestershire, a prehistoric religious site and location of a medieval castle
Windmill Tump: a Neolithic burial site west of the village of Rodmarton, Gloucestershire
Wormelow Tump: village in Herefordshire, location of the burial mound of King Arthur's son Amr

References

Geography-related lists